Intellectual Mastery of Nature: Theoretical Physics from Ohm to Einstein is a two-volume reference work on the history of theoretical physics by Christa Jungnickel and Russell McCormmach that was initially published in 1986 by the University of Chicago Press. The book was well received and it won the 1987 Pfizer Award, given annually by the History of Science Society. In 2017, the duo released a revised and condensed version of the book through Springer International Publishing titled The Second Physicist: On the History of Theoretical Physics in Germany. The authors also wrote the 1996 and updated 1999 biography of Henry Cavendish, originally titled Cavendish, the book was given the subtitle The Experimental Life in the revised version of 1999.

Background 
The book draws its name from Hermann von Helmholtz's view that the objective of theoretical physics is the "intellectual mastery of nature".

Content 

 Volume I: The Torch of Mathematics: 1800-1870

 Volume 2: The Now Mighty Theoretical Physics: 1870-1925

Reception 
Intellectual Mastery of Nature was met with critical acclaim and won the 1987 Pfizer Award, the highest award offered by the History of Science Society. The book was reviewed by John L. Heilbron, Jed Buchwald, I. Bernard Cohen, John Servos, L. Pearce Williams, Nancy J. Nersessian, and Paul Forman. In his 1988 review, Bernard Cohen wrote that the book is "replete with historical insights about science" and represents "a magisterial contribution to social, educational, institutional, and intellectual history and a magnificent portrayal of the actual growth and content of the science with which they are concerned." The book was also reviewed in Science, Nature, The Journal of Higher Education, Minerva, American Scientist, and several others; in a 2017 review of the authors' newer book The Second Physicist, it was remarked that the original was a "monumental" book "which was widely praised and justly given the Pfizer Award".

In his 1986 review, John L. Heilbron wrote that the book "is a unique, important and rich study" that is "useful to both historians and scientists". The review noted that the book provides a good account of the deeds of "the professors who made theoretical physics" and continued: "This is a considerable achievement, though not the intellectual mastery that the authors promised." The review then goes on to analyze the book by first stating that the first volume "gives a definitive account of the establishment of the institutions of German academic physics", but that it "does not integrate institutional and intellectual aspects of the history and scarcely touches on wider social forces and cultural values." Heilbron also criticized the book's organization, which, to him, exemplifies the volume's shortcomings. Heilbron notes the second volume is more successful in this integration than the first. THe review closes by stating: "Their stately re counting ultimately overwhelms annoyance with the detail, the poor arrangement, and the imperfect integration of their book and leaves the impression that they as well as their subjects engaged in a grand enterprise."

The Second Physicist 

The Second Physicist: On the History of Theoretical Physics in Germany is a revised and condensed version of Intellectual Mastery of Nature by the same authors that was published by Springer International Publishing in 2017. The book was reviewed in HOPOS in 2019. The first chapter, which is new for this book, is titled "Toward a Characterization of Theoretical Physics in Germany" and contains a discussion on how theoretical physics differs from mathematical and experimental physics. The final chapter of the book, titled "Concluding Observations", is also new and contains a discussion on how theoretical physics evolved from mathematical physics. A review of the book stated that "it is a splendid one-volume history of German theoretical physics in the nineteenth century", though its "appropriate audience" is stated to be "readers with a background in physics and mathematics and an interest in the history of physics". The reviewer went on to write that the work "stands on its own as a model of intellectual clarity" and that he "highly" recommends it "to readers with the requisite background and interest, as well as to other readers who would like to experience something different and really amazing." Jungnickel died before the book was published and the new material and the updates are credited to McCormmach.

 Table of contents

Publication history 
  (hardcover)
  (hardcover)
  (paperback)
  (eBook)
  (hardcover)
  (paperback)

See also 

 A History of the Theories of Aether and Electricity
 The Maxwellians

References

Further reading 

 
 
 
 
 
 
 
 
 

Springer Science+Business Media books
1986 non-fiction books
2017 non-fiction books
Books about the history of physics
University of Chicago Press books